Stephen McGuire (born 18 August 1984) is a Scottish Boccia player.

Personal life
McGuire was born on 18 August 1984, in Bellshill, North Lanarkshire, Scotland. He was born with muscular dystrophy, a degenerative condition that means he requires the use of a wheelchair.

McGuire is known to work in the community, helping with disabled young people and is an ambassador for the Muscular Dystrophy Campaign. He has recently attended his third Paralympic Games in Tokyo.

Boccia
He competes in the BC4 classification. In pairs events, he was most successful with his brother Peter who also has muscular dystrophy.

McGuire is the most successful British BC4 Boccia athlete; a ten-time Scottish Champion, thirteen-time British Champion, four-time European Champion, and former World Champion. In his early career and competing with his elder brother Peter he won the gold medal in the BC4 pairs event at the 2009 European Championships held in Porto, Portugal. In 2010, they won the silver medal at the World Championships in Lisbon, Portugal. Other major championship medals include European Silver from Hamar, Norway 2011 as well as retaining European Gold in the Pairs event in 2013, multiple World Open medals in Povoa Portugal, Montreal Canada and reaching the pinnacle of his career by securing the World Championship Individual Gold medal in Beijing 2016.

In 2012 both Stephen and Peter were selected as part of the Boccia squad for Great Britain at the 2012 Summer Paralympics. In the lead up to the games they participated in a documentary detailing their journey through life and into sport., marking his first games. Subsequently competing in Rio de Janeiro and Tokyo.

References

External links 
 
 

1984 births
Living people
Paralympic boccia players of Great Britain
Boccia players at the 2012 Summer Paralympics
Boccia players at the 2020 Summer Paralympics
Boccia players at the 2016 Summer Paralympics